The 1927 State of the Union Address was given on Tuesday, December 6, 1927.  It was given by Calvin Coolidge, the 30th United States President, to the 70th United States Congress.  He said, "For many years the Federal Government has been building a system of dikes along the Mississippi River for protection against high water. During the past season the lower States were overcome by a most disastrous flood. Many thousands of square miles were inundated a great many lives were lost, much livestock was drowned, and a very heavy destruction of property was inflicted upon the inhabitants."  He talks about controlling and preventing floods.

References

Presidency of Calvin Coolidge
Speeches by Calvin Coolidge
State of the Union addresses
70th United States Congress
State of the Union Address
State of the Union Address
State of the Union Address
State of the Union Address
December 1927 events
State of the Union